Zoran Mićović is the mayor of Arilje, Serbia. He is a member of the Democratic Party.
Mićović is the CVO of Veterinary directorate of Ministru of agriculture forestry, trade end water management.

References
Dr Zoran Mićović  

Year of birth missing (living people)
Living people
Democratic Party (Serbia) politicians
Mayors of places in Serbia
Place of birth missing (living people)
People from Arilje